Teodoro Viero (1740–1819) was an Italian printmaker and publisher, active in Venice.

Life 
Teodoro Viero was born on 19 March 1740. He was a pupil of Nicolò Cavalli, Pitteri and Bartolozzi, from whom he learnt the art of engraving. He practised as a miniature painter, engraver and publisher in Venice. He specialised in views of Venice. He died on 2 August 1819, or according to some sources on 2 October 1821. He was the maternal uncle of Luigi Schiavonetti.

References

Sources 

 Beyer, Andreas; Savoy, Bénédicte; Tegethoff, Wolf, eds. (2021). "Viero, Teodoro". Allgemeines Künstlerlexikon - International Artist Database - Online. Berlin, New York: K. G. Saur. Retrieved 12 October 2022.
 "Teodoro Viero". British Museum. Retrieved 12 October 2022.

Further reading 

 Gallo, Rodolfo (1941). L'incisione nel '700 a Venezia e a Bassano. Venice: Libreria Serenissima Depositaria. pp. 36–38.

1740 births
1819 deaths
18th-century Italian artists
Italian engravers